John Drewery, DCL was  an English Anglican priest in the late 16th and early 17th centuries.

Drewry was born in Pulborough and educated at Lincoln College, Oxford. He held livings at  Pulborough and Witney. He was appointed a Canon of Chichester Cathedral in 1582 and Archdeacon of Oxford in 1592.  Drewry died on 9 June 1614.

Notes

1614 deaths
18th-century English Anglican priests
Archdeacons of Oxford
Alumni of Lincoln College, Oxford
Chichester Cathedral
People from Pulborough